Umbilia hesitata, common name the umbilicate cowry or wonder cowry is a species of sea snail, a cowry, a marine gastropod mollusc in the family Cypraeidae, the cowries.

Description
The dorsal dome is smooth, round and appears almost inflated. The basic color of this cowry is white or pale brown or light pink, with many brown irregular small spots, especially close to the edges. The anterior and the posterior extremities are rostrate, with well-developed flanges, extended around the base. The base is mainly white, with a large sinuous aperture and small teeth. Females are smaller than males.

Distribution
This species is widely distributed from South Australia to southern Queensland, mainly in the seas along Victoria, New South Wales and along northern and eastern Tasmania.

Habitat
They likely feed on bryozoa or sponges. In parts of Tasmania, the species occurs in much shallower water in the subtidal zone.

Subspecies
Umbilia hesitata beddomei Schlinder, 1930 (dwarf form)
Umbilia hesitata howelli Iredale, 1931 (albina form)

References

 Felix Lorenz and Alex Hubert : A Guide to Worldwide Cowries, second revised edition - Conch Books, 2002
 Burgess, C.M. (1970) - The Living Cowries - AS Barnes and Co, Ltd. Cranbury, New Jersey 
 Wilson B. & Clarkson P. (2004) Australia's spectacular cowries. A review and field study of two endemic genera: Zoila and Umbilia. Odyssey Publishing, El Cajon, California. 396 pp.
 Lorenz F. & Massiglia D. (2005) Umbilia oriettae nov. sp. - An overlooked species from Eastern Australia (Gastropoda: Cypraeidae). Visaya 1(5): 37-44. [November 2005]
 Felix Lorenz 2010 - U.h.portladensis
 Grove, S.J. (2011) - A Guide to the Seashells and other Marine Molluscs of Tasmania -  Shells of Tasmania
 Grove, S.J. (2011) - The seashells of Tasmania: a comprehensive guide.  Taroona Publications, Tasmania.
 Thomas A. Darragh - A revision of the Australian genus Umbilia (Gastropoda: Cypraeidae  - Memoirs of the Museum of Victoria 59(2): 355–392 (2002)

External links
 Biolib
 Umbilia hesitata hesitata

Cypraeidae
Gastropods described in 1884